Our Lady of Fátima is a title of the Virgin Mary based on several reported apparitions at Fátima, Portugal.

Our Lady of Fátima may also refer to:

Churches
 Cathedral of Our Lady of Fatima (disambiguation)
 Our Lady of Fatima Church (disambiguation)

Places
 Our Lady of Fatima Island (Fatimathuruth) in the Islands of Kollam, India

Schools and colleges
 Our Lady of Fatima Catholic School in Courtland, Ontario, Canada
 Our Lady of Fatima Convent High School in Patiala, Punjab, India
 Our Lady of Fatima High School in Warren, Rhode Island, United States
 Our Lady of Fatima High School, Aligarh in Aligarh, Uttar Pradesh, India
 Our Lady of Fatima University in Valenzuela City, Philippines
 Seminary of Our Lady of Fatima in East Timor

See also
 Fatima (disambiguation)
 The Miracle of Our Lady of Fatima, 1953 film
 Nossa Senhora de Fátima, Macau, a freguesia (parish) in Macau Peninsula, Macau